A fudge factor is an ad hoc quantity or element introduced into a calculation, formula or model in order to make it fit observations or expectations.  Also known as a "Correction Coefficient" which is defined by:

Examples include Einstein's Cosmological Constant, dark energy, the initial proposals of dark matter and inflation.

Examples in science
Some quantities in scientific theory are set arbitrarily according to measured results rather than by calculation (for example, Planck's constant). However, in the case of these fundamental constants, their arbitrariness is usually explicit. To suggest that other calculations may include a "fudge factor" may suggest that the calculation has been somehow tampered with to make results give a misleadingly good match to experimental data.

Cosmological constant
In theoretical physics, when Albert Einstein originally tried to produce a general theory of relativity, he found that the theory seemed to predict the gravitational collapse of the universe: it seemed that the universe should either be expanding or collapsing, and to produce a model in which the universe was static and stable (which seemed to Einstein at the time to be the "proper" result), he introduced an expansionist variable (called the cosmological constant), whose sole purpose was to cancel out the cumulative effects of gravitation. He later called this, "the biggest blunder of my life."

Expected error margins

A common feature of "fudge factors" in science is their arbitrariness, and their retrospective nature.

However, in project management it is common to build a certain error margin into the predicted "resource cost" of a project to make predictions more realistic: there are many unforeseen factors that may delay a project or make it more costly, but very few factors that could result in it being delivered before time or under the calculated budget ... so to some degree, "unexpected" overruns are to be expected, even if their precise nature can't be predicted. Experienced planners may know that a certain type of project will tend to overrun by a certain percentage of its calculated resource requirements, and may multiply the "ideal" calculations by a safety margin to produce a more realistic estimate, and this margin may sometimes be referred to as a fudge factor. 
However, when planning ahead for expected unpredictabilities, these "error margins" are usually assigned other, more specific names: for instance in warehouse stock control, where a certain amount of stock is expected to disappear naturally through damage, pilfering or other unexplained problems, the discrepancy is referred to as shrinkage.

In engineering, a "fudge factor" may be introduced to allow a margin of error in unknown quantities.

See also
Anthropic principle
Confidence interval
Plug (accounting)

References

Heuristics
Error